Bräkne can refer to:

Bräkne Hundred - a hundred of Blekinge in Sweden
Bräkne-Hoby Parish - a parish in Bräkne Hundred